Firdaus Dadi is an Indian actress. She made her acting debut in the 1992 film Tahalka and then moved into television, making her debut in the show Banegi Apni Baat (1994). She went on to appear in many shows throughout the 1990s and early 2000s including Parampara, Imtihaan, and Aahat. After a break she returned to television with the serial, Aane Wala Pal.

Filmography

Television 

Parampara
Sansar
Imtihaan  as Pooja
Grihalakshmi Ka Jinn
Gopaljee  as Sonia
Aahat
 Astitva...Ek Prem Kahani (2002–2006) as  Rashmi Mathur 
Zara Si Zindagi (2005)
C.I.D. (2003)
Aane Wala Pal

References

External links

Indian television actresses
Indian film actresses
Living people
Year of birth missing (living people)
Place of birth missing (living people)
20th-century Indian actresses
21st-century Indian actresses